Hussain Al-Musawi (born 11 July 1988) is a Kuwaiti footballer who plays as a striker for Kuwaiti Premier League club Al Arabi and the Kuwait national football team.

International career

International goals
Scores and results list Kuwait's goal tally first.

Honors

Club
Kuwait Emir Cup 2007–08
Kuwait Crown Prince Cup 2011–12 2014-15
Kuwait Super Cup 2008, 2012
Kuwait Federation Cup 2013-14

International
Gulf Cup of Nations 2010
West Asian Football Federation Championship 2010

References

External links
 

1988 births
Living people
Kuwaiti footballers
Kuwaiti people of Iranian descent
Al-Arabi SC (Kuwait) players
Sportspeople from Kuwait City
Kuwait international footballers
Kuwaiti Shia Muslims
Footballers at the 2006 Asian Games
Footballers at the 2010 Asian Games
Association football forwards
Association football wingers
Asian Games competitors for Kuwait
Kuwait Premier League players
Al Salmiya SC players